Raymond Monica is an American football coach and former player. He is the head coach  at PennWest Clarion in Clarion, Pennsylvania, a position he has held since 2022. Monica served as the head football coach at Kutztown University of Pennsylvania from 2006 to 2012 and Arkansas Tech University from 2013 to 2018.

Head coaching record

College

References

Year of birth missing (living people)
Living people
American football quarterbacks
Arkansas Tech Wonder Boys football coaches
Kutztown Golden Bears football coaches
North Alabama Lions football coaches
Southeastern Louisiana Lions football coaches
Temple Owls football coaches
Junior college football coaches in the United States
Junior college football players in the United States
University of North Alabama alumni